Trichieurina is a genus of flies in the family Chloropidae.

Species 
 T. pubescens (Meigen, 1830)

References 

 Europe

Chloropinae
Chloropidae genera